For the British school headmaster, see Augustus Saunders.

Augustus Leon Saunders Jr. (August 9, 1909 - 1999) was a professional baseball second baseman in the Negro leagues. He played with the Cleveland Hornets, Detroit Stars, and Monroe Monarchs from 1927 to 1932. In some sources, his career is combined with that of Bob Saunders.

References

External links
 and Seamheads

Cleveland Hornets players
Detroit Stars players
Monroe Monarchs players
1909 births
1999 deaths
Baseball second basemen
Baseball players from Alabama
20th-century African-American sportspeople